Parkers Chapel School District  is a public school district based in El Dorado, Arkansas, United States.  The school district encompasses  of land in Union County serving El Dorado and Junction City.

Schools 
 Parkers Chapel High School, serving more than 300 students in grades 7 through 12.
 Parkers Chapel Elementary School, serving more than 350 students in prekindergarten through grade 6.

See also 

 El Dorado School District

References

External links
 

Education in Union County, Arkansas
School districts in Arkansas